Angiolillo Arcuccio (Naples, active 1440–1492) was an Italian painter of the early Renaissance. Few works are authenticated. He is best exemplified by the Annunciation altarpiece (1483) at the church of the Annunciation just outside Sant'Agata de' Goti, north of Naples. Ferrari and other scholars note a Flemish influence in later paintings. He collaborated with Gaspare de Orta in painting for a salon in Castelnuovo.

References

Bibliography

15th-century Neapolitan people
15th-century Italian painters
Italian male painters
Painters from Naples
Year of death unknown
Year of birth unknown